The Unique Street Reference Number (USRN) is an eight-digit unique identifier (a geocode) for every street across Great Britain. 

The USRNs for England and Wales exists within the National Street Gazetteer (NSG), the authoritative source of information about streets in England and Wales and is a compilation of data from 173 highway authorities' Local Street Gazetteers. The NSG is managed by GeoPlace as a joint venture between the Local Government Association and Ordnance Survey to create definitive national databases of addresses and streets.

USRNs in Scotland are managed by the Improvement Service, and in Northern Ireland by the Department for Infrastructure.

The USRN is available from the NSG and included in Ordnance Survey's OS MasterMap Highways Network product. USRNs can also be found on the site Find My Street created by GeoPlace.

From 1 July 2020, the Government requires USRNs and Unique Property Reference Numbers (UPRNs) to be available under an Open Government Licence (OGL). The OS Open USRN dataset is derived from the OS MasterMap Highways Network product.

The Government Digital Service has mandated  the UPRN and USRN as "the public sector standard for referencing and sharing property and street information".

References

External links

Find My Street
 Map of USRNs overlaid on OpenStreetMap data

Streets in the United Kingdom
Geocodes